Hurricane Rick was the fifth named storm and fourth hurricane to make landfall along the Pacific coast of Mexico in 2021. The seventeenth named system and the eighth hurricane of the 2021 Pacific hurricane season, Rick formed as a low pressure system and was quickly upgraded to a tropical depression on October 21. Late on October 22, the storm was designated as a tropical storm and was given the name Rick. A few hours later, on October 23, the storm was upgraded to a hurricane. Rick continued to intensify and reached peak intensity early on October 25, making landfall as a Category 2 hurricane at 10:00 UTC that morning.

Rick caused one confirmed fatality in Mexico, and caused over $10 million (2021 USD) in damages.

Meteorological history

On October 18, the National Hurricane Center (NHC) started highlighting the chances of development of a low pressure area offshore the Pacific coast of Mexico. An area of disturbed weather became identifiable south of the coasts of Guatemala and El Salvador on the next day. Shower and thunderstorm activity was initially scattered, and only gradual development was expected, although the NHC noted that the system would likely become a tropical depression by October 24. On the afternoon of October 21, a broad area of low pressure developed just south of the Gulf of Tehuantepec. Shower activity gradually became better organized, although an advanced scatterometer pass early on October 22 revealed that the system had not developed a closed wind circulation. However, a rapid increase in organization soon occurred, and following a Dvorak classification of T2.0/, the NHC upgraded the low pressure system into a tropical depression at 15:00 UTC on October 21.

At the time of genesis, the depression was moving briskly to the west under the influence of a ridge to its north. Situated within an environment of little vertical wind shear, high moisture, and of warm sea surface temperatures near , the depression was upgraded into a tropical storm that evening after an increase in curved band features and upper-level outflow in all directions. That afternoon, Rick attained hurricane status as the cyclone began to curve north-northwestward in response to a weakness in the ridge. Based on wind measurements from a Hurricane Hunter aircraft, Rick was upgraded into a Category 2 hurricane on the Saffir-Simpson scale at 06:00 UTC on October 25. At 10:00 UTC, Rick made landfall between Lázaro Cárdenas and Zihuatanejo while at its peak intensity. The system then rapidly weakened while it moved further inland, towards the mountainous terrain of Mexico. Early on October 26, Rick dissipated over west-central Mexico.

Preparations and impact 
Under the anticipation that Rick would make landfall along the southwestern coast of Mexico, a hurricane watch was issued on the afternoon of October 22 from Zihuatanejo, Guerrero, to Punta San Telmo, Michoacán, with tropical storm watches posted east and west of the hurricane watch area. Within 18 hours, these watches were upgraded to warnings. The Servicio Meteorológico Nacional warned that the states of Jalisco, Morelos, Puebla, Mexico City, Nayarit and the State of Mexico could see heavy rainfall, with the potential of flooding. Four reservoirs in Colima and Guererro, along with four rivers in the latter, as well as three rivers and dams in Michoacán, four rivers and three dams in Oaxaca were monitored for flooding. A total of 2,260 temporary shelters were set up for possible evacuees across five states. Three ports in Guerrero, Acapulco, Puerto Marqués and Zihuatanejo along with Lázaro Cárdenas in Michoacán were closed on October 23. In Colima, a blue alert was issued.

While still at sea, Rick was responsible for  waves along coastal areas of Guerrero while winds from the outer fringes of the storm's circulation uprooted trees, although there was no major damage across the state. A 35-year-old man was killed after he was swept away in the municipality of Tepoztlán. Across Guerrero, 37 homes were flooded, including 30 in the municipality of Tecpan de Galeana and 5 in Acapulco, which resulted in 42 families seeking shelter. Two rivers overflowed their banks in Zihuatanejo and two more overflowed their banks in the municipality of Tecpan de Galeana. Statewide, seventy-five trees were uprooted and six roads were destroyed. Across Zihuatanejo and Acapulco, cars were seen stranded in floodwaters and the Acapulco-Zihuatanejo highway was cut off by floodwaters in the municipality of Petatlán. Blackouts were reported in the Costa Chica and Costa Grande regions of Guerrero and extended as far east as in Acapulco. However, no injuries were reported. The storm was estimated to have caused over $10 million in damages.

See also

Weather of 2021
Tropical cyclones in 2021
List of Category 2 Pacific hurricanes
Other tropical cyclones named Rick
Hurricane Pauline (1997)

References

External links

 The National Hurricane Center's advisory archive on Hurricane Rick

2021 Pacific hurricane season
Category 2 Pacific hurricanes
October 2021 events in Mexico
Rick
Hurricanes in Michoacán
Hurricanes in Guerrero
Hurricanes in Morelos